"Make Me Feel" is a collaborative single, written and conducted primarily by Galantis and East & Young. It was released on 11 August 2016, through Big Beat Records as the soundtrack to the 2016 film XOXO.

Charts

References

2016 singles
2016 songs
Galantis songs
Songs written by Christian Karlsson (DJ)
Songs written by Henrik Jonback
Songs written by Jon Hume
Songs written by Style of Eye
Songs written by Svidden